Limbodessus leysi is a carnivorous subterranean water beetle, in the Bidessini tribe of the Dytiscidae family. It was first described in 2006, and the species epithet honours the entomologist, Remko Leys.

The species is endemic to Western Australia, and found in the "easterly-draining palaeodrainage systems in the Yilgarn region of Western Australia".

References

Dytiscidae
Beetles of Australia
Beetles described in 2006